This page lists the World Best Year Performances in the year 2000 in the Marathon for both men and women. One of the main events during this season were the 2000 Summer Olympics in Sydney, Australia, where the final of the men's competition was held on October 1, 2000. The women had their Olympic race on September 24, 2000.

Men

Records

2000 World Year Ranking

Women

Records

2000 World Year Ranking

References
digilander.libero
2000 Marathon Ranking by the ARRS
IAAF

2000
 Marathon